Qaidi may refer to:

 Qaidi, Iran, a village in Jam Rural District, Bushehr Province, Iran
 Qaidi (1940 film), a Bollywood film
 Qaidi (1957 film), a Bollywood film
 Qaidi (1962 film), a Pakistani film
 Qaidi (1984 film), a Bollywood action film
 Qaidi (1986 film), a Pakistani Punjabi-language film